This article is a list of notable individuals who were born in and/or have lived in Las Animas, Colorado.

Academia
 Clement Markert (1917–1999), biologist

Arts and entertainment
 Ken Curtis (1916–1991), actor, singer
 Mari Yoriko Sabusawa (1920–1994), translator, editor, arts patron
 The Space Lady (1948– ), singer-songwriter, musician

Business
 William Bent (1809–1869), fur trader, rancher

Military
 Ora Graves (1896–1961), U.S. Navy Gunner's Mate 2nd Class, Medal of Honor recipient

Politics

National
 Lewis Babcock (1943– ), U.S. federal judge
 Robert E. Blackburn (1950– ), U.S. federal judge
 Donetta Davidson (1943– ), Election Assistance Commission chairperson
 Byron G. Rogers (1900–1983), U.S. Representative from Colorado
 Llewellyn Thompson (1904–1972), U.S. Ambassador to the Soviet Union

State
 Kenneth Kester (1936– ), Colorado state legislator

Local
 Emil Ganz (1838–1922), Mayor of Phoenix, Arizona
 Norma O. Walker (1928– ), Mayor of Aurora, Colorado

Sports
 Bailey Santistevan (1901–1954), coach; featured in the July 5, 1999 Sports Illustrated, Bailey's Boys He was inducted into the American Legion Fall of Fame where he is considered one of the most successful coaches in Legion baseball.

References

Las Animas, Colorado
Las Animas